Lukolayeh (also Romanized as Lūkolāyeh) is a village in Divshal Rural District, in the Central District of Langarud County, Gilan Province, Iran. At the 2006 census, its population was 395, in 119 families.

References 

Populated places in Langarud County